Jerges Mercado Suárez is a Bolivian politician. He has been President of the Chamber of Deputies since November 2022. He previously served as Minister of Services and Public Works.

References 

Living people

Year of birth missing (living people)

21st-century Bolivian politicians
Presidents of the Chamber of Deputies (Bolivia)
Government ministers of Bolivia
Movement for Socialism (Bolivia) politicians